Thomas F. Lowe (January 15, 1812November 18, 1875) was a Georgia musician, businessman, and politician who served as the acting mayor of Atlanta, during the early part of the American Civil War.

In 1858, T. F. Lowe was elected as an alderman representing Atlanta's Second Ward. Lowe and fellow future Atlanta mayor William Ezzard were among a group of investors that chartered the Atlanta Mutual Insurance and Stock Company in 1859.

In November 1861, he took over as Atlanta's mayor after incumbent Jared Whitaker was appointed to head the commissary and logistics activities for Georgia's state troops. He was not a candidate for election to a full term, and was succeeded by James M. Calhoun. He was commissioned as a colonel in the Georgia state militia. As a violin soloist, he was a local favorite and played many recitals in Atlanta and Decatur, even during the war.

Lowe died in Mount Airy, Georgia, and is buried in Atlanta's Oakland Cemetery.

Notes

References
 Gay, Mary A. & Segars, Joe Henry (2001) Life in Dixie During the War, Macon, Georgia: Mercer University Press 
 Reed, Wallace Putnam, ed. (1889) History of Atlanta, Georgia: with illustrations and biographical sketches. Syracuse, New York: D. Mason & Co.

Mayors of Atlanta
People of Georgia (U.S. state) in the American Civil War
1812 births
1875 deaths
19th-century American politicians
Burials at Oakland Cemetery (Atlanta)